Juan Morales (18 April 1956 – 11 September 2020) was a Uruguayan footballer. He played in four matches for the Uruguay national football team from 1975 to 1976. He was also part of Uruguay's squad for the 1975 Copa América tournament.

References

External links
 

1956 births
2020 deaths
Uruguayan footballers
Uruguay international footballers
Place of birth missing
Association football defenders
C.A. Cerro players
Peñarol players
Talleres de Córdoba footballers
Uruguayan expatriate footballers
Expatriate footballers in Argentina